The first USS Rush (SP-712) was a United States Navy patrol vessel in commission during 1917.

Rush was built as a private motorboat of the same name by Baker's Yacht Basin at Quincy, Massachusetts. On 1 May 1917, the U.S. Navy acquired her from her owner, N. H. White of Brookline, Massachusetts, for use as a section patrol boat during World War I. She was commissioned as USS Rush (SP-712) in 1917.

Rush was assigned to patrol duty in the 4th Naval District. On 8 December 1917, Rush was on a voyage from  Boston, Massachusetts, to Philadelphia, Pennsylvania, when she struck a submerged log at the entrance to the back channel of League Island Navy Yard in Philadelphia and was wrecked. All hands were saved.

Much of Rushs equipment was salvaged, but she was finally declared a total loss on 12 December 1918. R. B. Scott of Philadelphia purchased her hulk in 1921, but she does not appear ever to have been seaworthy again.

References

SP-712 Rush at Department of the Navy Naval History and Heritage Command Online Library of Selected Images: U.S. Navy Ships -- Listed by Hull Number "SP" #s and "ID" #s -- World War I Era Patrol Vessels and other Acquired Ships and Craft numbered from SP-700 through SP-799
NavSource Online: Section Patrol Craft Photo Archive Rush (SP 712)

History of Philadelphia
Patrol vessels of the United States Navy
World War I patrol vessels of the United States
Ships built in Quincy, Massachusetts
Maritime incidents in 1917
Shipwrecks of the Pennsylvania coast
World War I shipwrecks in the Atlantic Ocean